Castle Green may refer to:

 Castle Green, London, a suburb in Barking 
 Castle Green railway station
 Castle Green, South Yorkshire, England, a location in South Yorkshire
 Castle Green, Surrey, England, a small settlement near Chobham 
 Castle Park, Bristol, England, a public open space 
 Castle Green, the second building in the Hotel Green complex in Pasadena, California